George Millington (1862-1916) was an Irish author and academic, and a member of the Irish Literary Revival. His most well-known work is the novella St. Michan's Vaults, published in 1899.

References 

1862 births
1916 deaths
Irish scholars and academics